Sheeran is an Irish surname.

Origin and variants
According to a few sources, the surname is a reduced form of O’Sheeran which is an Anglicized form of Ó Sírín  or Ó Síoráin  meaning ‘descendant of Sírín/Síorán'. Derived from the personal name Síorán, from a diminutive of síor meaning ‘long-lasting’.

According to one source, Sheeran is derived from Mac Searthuin, which means son of Searthun.

People with the surname

Ed Sheeran (born 1991), English singer-songwriter of Irish descent
Frank Sheeran (1920–2003), labour union official accused of having links to organized crime and of being a hitman
Jethro Sheeran, British musician and rapper
Josette Sheeran (born 1954), American NGO executive
Laura Sheeran (born 1987), Irish singer and musician
Mark Sheeran (born 1982), English professional football striker
Michael J. Sheeran (born 1940), American priest and higher education administrator

References

Surnames of Irish origin
Anglicised Irish-language surnames